Ratemo Michieka is a former director-general of the National Environmental Management Authority (NEMA) in Kenya; he is also  the founding Vice-Chancellor of Jomo Kenyatta University of Agriculture and Technology.

For a long time, Michieka worked in education and agricultural policy in Eastern Africa. He earned a doctorate in weed science from Rutgers University. He returned to his native Kenya, where he taught and later became chairman of the Department of Crop Science at the University of Nairobi. In 1994, he was named vice chancellor of Jomo Kenyatta University of Agriculture and Technology in Nairobi, Kenya, a post equivalent to a U.S. university president. He held the post until he was appointed Director General of the National Environmental Management Authority.

Politics
In 2008 Ratemo Michieka ran for the parliamentary seat of Nyaribari Masaba. He came in third behind Prof. Sam Ongeri and Dr. Hezron Manduku.

References

3. Rutgers university hall of distinguished alumni 

4. Kyoto protocol compliance committee 

Kenyan educators
People from Nairobi
Year of birth missing (living people)
Living people